Amiya Kumar Bagchi (born 1936) is an Indian political economist.

Biography

His academic career began when he started teaching in Presidency College, Kolkata. In the 1960s, he taught in the Faculty of Economics in Cambridge (where he was Fellow of Jesus College), but resigned his post in 1969, to resume his academic career in Presidency College, Kolkata.

In 1974 he joined the newly founded Centre for Studies in Social Sciences, Calcutta.

Bagchi has specialised in the history of Indian banking and finance, and acted as Official Historian of the State Bank of India (SBI) from 1976 to 1998; he played a leading role in ensuring that the unique archives of SBI are preserved for posterity.

After retiring as Reserve Bank of India professor from the Centre for Studies in Social Sciences, Calcutta in 2001, he became the founder-director of the Institute of Development Studies, Kolkata.

Awards and honours
The professional awards and honours Bagchi has received include:

 Padma Shri of the government of India 2005.

Bibliography

Bagchi has authored over 250 academic articles and has authored and edited numerous books and monographs.

The books he has authored include:
2010 Colonialism and Indian Economy, Oxford University Press
2005 Perilous Passage: Mankind and the Global Ascendancy of Capital, Rowman & Littlefield Publishers
2004 The Developmental State in History and in the Twentieth Century, New Delhi: Regency
2002 Capital and Labour Redefined: India and the Third World, Anthem Press
1997 The Evolution of the State Bank of India: The Era of the Presidency Banks 1876–1920, Sage Publications
1989 The Presidency Banks and the Indian Economy 1876–1914, Bombay:. Oxford University Press
1987 Public Intervention and Industrial Restructuring in China, India and Republic of Korea, New Delhi: ILO-ARTEP
1987, reissued 2006 The Evolution of the State Bank of India. The Roots, 1806–1876, Oxford University Press; reissued by Penguin Portfolio
1982 The Political Economy of Underdevelopment, Cambridge University Press
1972 Private Investment in India 1900–1939, Cambridge University Press

Edited and co-edited volumes
2007 Capture and Exclude: Developing Economies and the Poor in Global Finance (with Gary A. Dymski)  New Delhi: Tulika
2005 Webs of History: Information, Communication and Technology from Early to Post-Colonial India (with D. Sinha and B. Bagchi), New Delhi: Manohar
2005 Maladies, Preventives, and Curatives: Debates in Public Health in India (with K. Soman), New Delhi: Tulika
2003 Economy and the Quality of Life: Essays in Memory of Ashok Rudra (with M. Chattopadhyay and R. Khasnabis), Kolkata: Dasgupta & Co.
2002 Money and Credit in Indian History since Early Medieval Times, New Delhi: Tulika
1999 Multiculturalism, Liberalism and Democracy (with R. Bhargava and R. Sudarshan), Oxford University Press
1999 Economy and Organization: Indian Institutions under the Neoliberal Regime, Sage Publications
1995 Democracy and Development: Proceedings of the IEA Conference Held in Barcelona, Spain, Palgrave Macmillan
1995 New Technology and the Workers’ Response: Microelectronics, Labour and Society, Sage Publications
1988 Economy, Society and Polity: Essays in the Political Economy of Indian Planning in Honour of Professor Bhabatosh Datta, Oxford University Press

Chapters in books

References

External links
Kurien, CT, Review of PERILOUS PASSAGE — Mankind and the Global Ascendancy of Capital, The Hindu (3 October 2006)
Radical Notes, Capital and capitalists nannied by the states: An Interview with Amiya Kumar Bagchi, Radical Notes (18 October 2008)
Murali, D,   'Property Right Subjugation by British Land Tax,' review of an essay in Bagchi's 2010 book Colonialism and Indian Economy, The Hindu Businessline (17 July 2010).

1936 births
Bengali historians
Bengali Hindus
Bengali writers
20th-century Bengalis
Bengali scientists
Presidency University, Kolkata alumni
Economic historians
Academic staff of Presidency University, Kolkata
Alumni of Trinity College, Cambridge
Indian institute directors
20th-century Indian economists
Indian Marxists
Indian Marxist writers
Indian Marxist historians
Marxian economists
Recipients of the Padma Shri in literature & education
University of Calcutta alumni
Academic staff of the University of Calcutta
Living people
Indian political writers
Indian political scientists
Indian social sciences writers
Indian economics writers
Indian male writers
20th-century Indian writers
People from Murshidabad district
20th-century Indian scientists
Scientists from West Bengal
Writers from West Bengal
Indian non-fiction writers
Indian male non-fiction writers
20th-century Indian non-fiction writers
Indian economists
Indian scholars
20th-century Indian scholars
21st-century Indian scholars
21st-century Indian economists
Indian columnists
Indian essayists
Indian male essayists
20th-century Indian essayists
21st-century Indian essayists
Indian social scientists
20th-century Indian social scientists
21st-century Indian social scientists
Indian development economists
Indian development specialists
Indian sociologists